Paixão Fernando Afonso (born 2 January 1991 in Luanda) is an Angolan sailor. At the 2016 Summer Olympics he competed in the Men's 470 with Matias Montinho. They finished in 26th place. He qualified to represent Angola at the 2020 Summer Olympics in the men's 470 with Matias Montinho again.

References

External links

Living people
1991 births
Sportspeople from Luanda
Angolan male sailors (sport)
Olympic sailors of Angola
Sailors at the 2016 Summer Olympics – 470
Sailors at the 2020 Summer Olympics – 470
African Games bronze medalists for Angola
African Games medalists in sailing
Competitors at the 2011 All-Africa Games